Patrick Cunningham may refer to:
 Patrick Cunningham (politician)
 Patrick Cunningham (inventor)
 Pat Cunningham, Australian rules footballer